Goshute is an unincorporated community in Juab County, Utah, United States on the Confederated Tribes of the Goshute Reservation.

See also

 List of ghost towns in Utah

References

External links

Unincorporated communities in Juab County, Utah
Unincorporated communities in Utah
Goshute